Prince Hyoji (Hangul: 효지태자, Hanja: 孝祗太子) was a prince of Goryeo as the second and youngest son of Taejo of Goryeo and Lady Cheonanbuwon of the Gyeongju Im clan. He was a Buddhist and the younger brother of Prince Hyoseong.

References

Korean princes
Year of birth unknown
Year of death unknown
10th-century Korean people